Edward Dennis may refer to:

Eddie Dennis, wrestler
Edward Dennis (MP) for Yarmouth (Isle of Wight) (UK Parliament constituency)